Motuarohia Island (Roberton Island) is a small island in the Bay of Islands of New Zealand, located about  northeast of Russell.
The twin lagoons nearly reach across the island to the bay on the south coast, almost bisecting the island.

The majority of the island is in private ownership, however,  of public conservation land in the central section of the island are managed by the Department of Conservation.

The New Zealand Ministry for Culture and Heritage gives a translation of "reconnoitred island" for Motuarohia.

History
Motuarohia Island has a long history of human settlement, as evidenced by archaeological sites including a pa site, terraces and pits.
In 1769, Captain James Cook anchored  just south of the island, hence one of the bays is named Cook's Cove. His reports indicated that there were 200 to 300 Maori on the island and a pa at the eastern tip of the island.

The island became also known as Roberton Island after the one-time owner who purchased it from Ngapuhi chiefs in 1839.  Ownership of parts of the island changed hands later, and since 1979 the central section of the island, including the lagoons, is publicly accessible Department of Conservation land.

Conservation
As part of the Department of Conservation's "Project Island Song", Motuarohia is pest-free and home to a number of endangered bird species, such as whitehead, brown kiwi, and NZ dotterels during breeding season.

Native forest is regenerating in most parts of the island, in particular in an area of felled pine at the western end.

Recreation
The twin lagoons in the central section of the island are surrounded by kikuyu grass flats.  This area is used as a stopover point by small tour boats from Paihia and Russell, although not as popular as the much larger Urupukapuka Island nearby.  At Motuarohia Island, the tour boats anchor in the bay and use a small tender to ferry passengers to the sandy beach.
A walking track leads from this area to a lookout point overlooking the twin lagoons.  There is also a walking track to the pa site, and an educational underwater trail for snorkellers.

See also
 List of islands of New Zealand

References

Far North District
Islands of the Bay of Islands